Ferdinando Miniussi (1 September 1940 in Trieste – 13 September 2001 in Cervignano del Friuli) was an Italian professional footballer who played as a goalkeeper.

Honours

Club
Inter
 Serie A champion: 1965–66.

1940 births
2001 deaths
Footballers from Trieste
Italian footballers
Serie A players
U.S. Triestina Calcio 1918 players
S.S.D. Varese Calcio players
Inter Milan players
S.S.C. Bari players
Udinese Calcio players
U.S. Avellino 1912 players
Association football goalkeepers